Tini may refer to:

Tiny Internet Interface, a microcontroller that includes the facilities necessary to connect to the Internet
Titanium nitride, an extremely hard ceramic material, often used as a coating to improve surface properties
Tini, Iran, a village in Kermanshah Province, Iran
Tini (album), 2016 debut solo album by TINI
Tini Tini Tini, 2020 studio album by TINI

Persons
Tinì Cansino (born 1959), stage name of Photina Lappa, Greek actress and television personality, mainly active in Italy
Tini Kerei Taiaroa (1846–1934), New Zealand personality and community worker
Tini Wagner (1919-2004), Dutch freestyle swimmer
Clelia Tini (born 1992), Sammarinese swimmer
Jody Tini (born 1976), New Zealand female basketball player
Tini (born 1997), Argentine actress, singer-songwriter, dancer and model, also known for her lead role in Disney's series Violetta

Other
tini (software), alternative init included in Docker